The rufous-backed sibia (Leioptila annectens) is a passerine bird in the family Leiothrichidae.

It was formerly placed in the genus Heterophasia but is now the only species in the genus Leioptila.

It is found from the Himalayas to south-central Vietnam.
Its natural habitats are subtropical or tropical moist lowland forests and subtropical or tropical moist montane forests.

References

 Collar, N. J. & Robson C. 2007. Family Timaliidae (Babblers)  pp. 70 – 291 in; del Hoyo, J., Elliott, A. & Christie, D.A. eds. Handbook of the Birds of the World, Vol. 12. Picathartes to Tits and Chickadees. Lynx Edicions, Barcelona.

rufous-backed sibia
Birds of Bhutan
Birds of Northeast India
Birds of Southeast Asia
rufous-backed sibia
rufous-backed sibia
Taxonomy articles created by Polbot